The William V. Campbell, formerly the Vincent dePaul Draddy Trophy, is  awarded by the National Football Foundation to the American college football player with the best combination of academics, community service, and on-field performance.  It is considered by many to be the "Academic Heisman" and nicknamed as such.

While many major college football awards are theoretically open to players at all competitive levels, in practice, only players at NCAA Division I level win them.  The Campbell Trophy is unique in that it has been won by a player at a lower level—Brandon Roberts of Washington University in St. Louis, an NCAA Division III school, in 2002.

The trophy is named for William Campbell, a business executive and former player, captain and head coach at Columbia University.  It was previously named in honor of Vincent dePaul Draddy, who served the National Football Foundation (NFF) and its College Football Hall of Fame for 33 years, including 19 years as the chairman of its board of directors.  It has become the most prestigious and desirable "academic" award in college football.  The trophy recognizes an individual as the absolute best in the country for his academic success, football performance, and exemplary community leadership.

A scholar-athlete himself at Manhattan College, Draddy passionately believed in the premise that excellence on the football field could, and should, be consistent with academic distinction and the highest standards of civic leadership.  He thought that young men who combined athletic performance with academic excellence should be recognized.  After his death in July 1990, the NFF perpetuated his memory and beliefs by establishing a scholarship that would recognize the scholar-athlete who most fully embodies the ideals of the NFF.

In 2014, Fidelity Investments became the presenting sponsor of the Campbell Trophy, with its official name becoming the William V. Campbell Trophy, presented by Fidelity Investments. In 2013, the New York Athletic Club became the official home of the trophy, and it is now on display as part of its Hall of Fame. The $25,000 postgraduate scholarship that accompanies the trophy is endowed by HealthSouth Corporation.

Winners
List of annual recipients since inception in 1990.

References

External links
 The William V. Campbell Trophy, National Football Foundation & College Hall of Fame website

 
College football national player awards
Student athlete awards in the United States
Awards established in 1990
1990 establishments in the United States